Romaniceras is a genus of Upper Cretaceous ammonites in the Acanthoceratidae subfamily Euomphaloceratinae.

The shell is rather evolute, whorl section circular to oval and Romaniceras differs from Acanthoceras in having 9 or 11 rows of tubercles, of which the ventrolateral may be clavate (i.e. elongate).  The ribs of Romaniceras specimens are strong and fairly close spaced.

References

Cretaceous ammonites
Acanthoceratidae
Ammonitida genera
Ammonites of Europe
Cenomanian genus first appearances
Turonian genus extinctions